Jeanette W. Hyde (born June 15, 1938) is an American diplomat. She was Ambassador of the United States to Barbados, Dominica, St Lucia from 1994 to 1998, and to Antigua, Grenada, St. Vincent, and St. Christopher-Nevis-Anguilla from 1995 to 1998, under Bill Clinton.

Biography
Jeanette W. Hyde was born in Hamptonville, North Carolina on June 15, 1938. She attended Wake Forest University, and received a B.S. from Delta State University in 1962. She later attended the University of Maryland on their Iraklion, Crete campus, and competed graduate studies in Counseling at the University of North Carolina, Chapel Hill and the North Carolina State University. She was teaching school for two years in Crete before going into social work and counseling with the N.C. Administrative Office of the Courts.

Hyde married the late Wallace Hyde, a Robbinsville, North Carolina native, and was a longtime Democratic Party fundraiser.

Hyde co-founded two banks in Raleigh, North Carolina, Triangle Bank and North State Bank.

Hyde serves on the board of directors of the North Carolina Board of Transportation, the North Carolina Global Transpark, the North Carolina International Trade Commission, Outward Bound of North Carolina, and the North Carolina Child Advocacy Institute. She also serves on the Board of Trustees of Wake Forest University, Western Carolina University, and American Diplomacy Journal, Inc. She previously served on the Board of The International Cabinet at the University of North Carolina at Wilmington, the Triangle World Affairs Council, Methodist Home for Children, the North Carolina Community Foundation and The Eisenhower Exchange Fellowship Board.

Awards 
In 1994, Hyde was awarded with the Outstanding Woman in Public Service Award by the YWCA Academy of Women.

In 1998, she received the Triangle World Affairs Council's Distinguished Citizen for Public Service Award and the International Visitors Council's Citizen of the World Award.

References

|-

|-

|-

|-

|-

|-

1938 births
Living people
People from North Carolina
Wake Forest University alumni
Delta State University alumni
University of Maryland, College Park alumni
University of North Carolina at Chapel Hill alumni
North Carolina State University alumni
American bankers
Ambassadors of the United States to Barbados
Ambassadors of the United States to Antigua and Barbuda
Ambassadors of the United States to Dominica
Ambassadors of the United States to Grenada
Ambassadors of the United States to Saint Lucia
Ambassadors of the United States to Saint Kitts and Nevis
Ambassadors of the United States to Saint Vincent and the Grenadines
American women bankers
American company founders
American women company founders
American women ambassadors
20th-century American diplomats
20th-century American women
21st-century American women